Bhupinder Singh Joon is an Indian lawyer and politician from Delhi belonging to Aam Aadmi Party. He is a member of the Delhi Legislative Assembly.

Biography
Joon studied in Birendra Narayan Chakraborty University. He was elected as a member of the  Delhi Legislative Assembly from Bijwasan on 11 February 2020. He defeated his nearest candidate Sat Prakash Rana of Bharatiya Janata Party by 753 votes in the election which is the lowest margin in 2020 Delhi Legislative Assembly election.

Member of Legislative Assembly (2020 - present)
Since 2020, he is an elected member of the 7th Delhi Assembly.

Committee assignments of Delhi Legislative Assembly 
 Member (2022-2023), Committee on Estimates

Electoral performance

References 

Living people
Delhi MLAs 2020–2025
Aam Aadmi Party politicians from Delhi
Birendra Narayan Chakraborty University alumni
Indian lawyers
Year of birth missing (living people)